General elections were held in Brazil on 4 October 1998 to elect the President, National Congress and state governorships. If no candidate in the presidential election received more than 50% of the vote in the first round, a second-round runoff would have been held on 25 October. The election saw voting machines used for the first time in Brazilian history.

Elected in 1994 amidst a hyperinflation crisis, President Fernando Henrique Cardoso of the centre-right Brazilian Social Democratic Party (PSDB) prioritized price stability policies during his term. Other notable policies pursued by Cardoso included the declaration of Decree 1775, which allowed for increased commercial interest in indigenous lands, and the privatization of publicly-owned companies. Vice President Marco Maciel of the conservative Liberal Front Party (PFL) served as Cardoso's running mate, as he did in the previous election.

Luiz Inácio Lula da Silva of the Workers' Party (PT), a former labor leader and federal deputy, ran for the presidency for a third time. Lula had previously run for the presidency in both 1989, where he lost to Fernando Collor, and 1994, where he lost to Cardoso. Lula chose Leonel Brizola of the Democratic Labour Party (PDT), a longtime fixture of the Brazilian Left who was a chief competitor of his in 1989, as his running mate.

In addition to Lula, Ciro Gomes, a populist who previously served as Governor of Ceará and as Minister of Finance in the conservative government of President Itamar Franco, mounted his own campaign. Running as a member of the centre-left Popular Socialist Party (PPS), Ciro attempted to present himself as a progressive alternative to Lula.

Cardoso won reelection with an absolute majority in the first round, negating the need for a second round. In doing so, he became the first President of Brazil to be reelected since the fall of the military dictatorship. Lula would later succeed him after winning the 2002 presidential election, and Ciro would mount a second presidential bid four years later in the 2002 presidential election, where he came in fourth place.

Background 
Fernando Henrique Cardoso, better known as "FHC", had been inaugurated as president on January 1, 1995, after defeating Luiz Inácio Lula da Silva, his main rival in the 1994 election, in the first round by an advantage of almost 30 million votes. FHC had based his first presidential campaign in the then newly launched Real Plan and the promise of stabilizing the economy of Brazil. As a matter of fact, the plan had a positive effect during the first years of his administration, being able to curb the exorbitant inflation rates, stabilize the exchange rate, and increase the purchasing power of the Brazilian population without shocks or price freezing.

On the very first day of his administration, the Treaty of Asunción came into force. Signed by Fernando Collor de Mello, it predicted the implementation of Mercosur, a free trade area between Brazil, Argentina, Uruguay, and Paraguay. Moreover, the first FHC administration was marked by political and economic reforms, such as the end of the state monopolies in oil and telecommunications, the reform on the social security plans, and the change in the concept of "national company".

Although approved in the Congress, the reforms carried by the federal government met strong resistance from the opposition, most notably the Workers' Party, which fiercely criticized the privatization of companies such as Vale do Rio Doce and the constitutional amendment that allowed the re-election of officeholders in the Executive branch. As a result, Peter Mandelson, a close aide to then British Prime Minister and Labour Party leader Tony Blair, alleged that the Workers' Party's proposals represented "an old-fashioned and out-of-date socialism". At that time, FHC-Blair relations were magnified, once both of them were adherents of the Third Way.

Despite its political victories, the government needed to impose measures to cool down the domestic demand and help the trade balance, which eventually caused unemployment to grow and made the economy show signs of recession. Other areas, such as health, education and land reform also suffered major crises. The violent conflict in the countryside reached its peak with the Eldorado dos Carajás massacre. Thus, FHC's reelection campaign was based on the idea that the continuity of his government was essential for the stabilization to reach areas other than the economy, such as health, agriculture, employment, education, and public security.

Presidential election

Candidates 
The 1998 presidential race had twelve candidates, the largest number of candidates since the 1989 election, when over twenty candidacies were launched. The number could have been as high as fifteen, but the Electoral Justice withdrew the candidacy of impeached President Fernando Collor de Mello, while Oswaldo Souza Oliveira and João Olivar Farias declined to run.

Brazilian Social Democratic Party (PSDB) 
The Brazilian Social Democratic Party (PSDB) reprised the coalition which had elected Cardoso four years prior, comprising the Liberal Front Party (PFL) and the Brazilian Labour Party (PTB). They were joined by the Progressive Party (PPB), the Social Democratic Party (PDS), and the Social Liberal Party (PSL). Once again, PFL member Marco Maciel served as Cardoso's running mate.

Workers' Party (PT)

The Workers' Party reprised its past two candidacies, by launching former union leader and federal deputy Luiz Inácio Lula da Silva as its candidate and forming a coalition with the Communist Party of Brazil, and the Brazilian Socialist Party. Other PT members, such as former Mayor of Porto Alegre Tarso Genro, were mentioned as potential candidates. Indeed, it was reported in 1997 that Lula was willing to give up his candidacy in favor of backing a bid by Genro, though this did not come to fruition.

The novelty in this election was the choice of longtime fixture of the Brazilian Left Leonel Brizola, a member of the Democratic Labour Party (PDT), as his running mate. Unlike in 1994, when close Lula ally and fellow PT member Aloízio Mercadante was chosen as Lula's running mate, Brizola had previously been a rival of Lula's, serving as his main opposition on the left in the 1989 election. The PT previously refrained from forming coalitions with parties linked to varguista labour unions to guarantee the Central Única dos Trabalhadores' (CUT) independence. As a result, the United Socialist Workers' Party left the coalition and launched union leader José Maria de Almeida as its candidate.

Brizola was noted for his combative style in contrast to Lula's more "diplomatic" tone on the campaign trail, while led the Folha de S.Paulo to declare that he "outshine[d]" Lula in their first joint appearance.

Socialist People's Party (PPS) 
Former Governor of Ceará Ciro Gomes run for president, and, therefore, his Socialist People's Party (PPS) did not join the Workers' Party coalition as they did in the previous election. After Oswaldo Souza Oliveira's quit the race, his Party of the Nation's Retirees decided to support Gomes.

Other candidates 
After securing the third place in the 1994 election, Enéas Carneiro from the far-right Party of the Reconstruction of the National Order (PRONA) also run in 1998. This time, however, he only received 1.4 million votes, against 4.6 million in 1994. Carneiro's running mate was Irapuan Teixeira, a professor who would later become a member of the Chamber of Deputies as a member of PRONA.

This election also brought the second woman candidate ever: Thereza Tinajero Ruiz from the National Labor Party, which replaced Dorival Masci de Abreu.

Results

President

Chamber of Deputies

Senate

Notes

References

Brazil
Gen
General elections in Brazil
Brazil